The 2012 Boys' Youth NORCECA Volleyball Championship was the eighth edition of the bi-annual Volleyball Tournament, played by eight countries from July 2–7, 2012 in Tijuana, Baja California, Mexico. The top two teams other than Mexico qualified to the 2013 Boys Youth World Championship, Mexico had already secured a berth as Host.

Teams

Pool standing procedure
Match won 3–0: 5 points for the winner, 0 point for the loser
Match won 3–1: 4 points for the winner, 1 points for the loser
Match won 3–2: 3 points for the winner, 2 points for the loser
In case of tie, the teams were classified according to the following criteria:
points ratio and sets ratio

Preliminary round

Pool A

Pool B

Final round

Championship bracket

5th–8th places bracket

Quarterfinals

5th–8th classification matches

Semifinals

7th place match

5th place match

3rd place match

Final

Final standing

Awards
MVP:  Osmany Uriarte
Best Scorer:  Osmany Uriarte
Best Spiker:  Inover Romero
Best Blocker:  Jorge Caraballo
Best Server:  Osmany Uriarte
Best Digger:  Luis Chavez
Best Setter:  Ricardo Calvo
Best Receiver:  Entenza Barbaro
Best Libero:  Luis Chavez

References

External links
 

Men's NORCECA Volleyball Championship
P
V
Volleyball